Galena River may refer to

Galena River (Illinois), tributary of the Mississippi River in northwest Illinois 
Galena River (Indiana), in northern Indiana, becoming the South Branch Galien River in Michigan

See also 
 Galena (disambiguation)